Euseius odoratus is a species of mite in the family Phytoseiidae.

References

odoratus
Articles created by Qbugbot
Animals described in 1991